The  Ministry of Youth and Sports is a Cabinet department in the Executive branch of the Republic of Bashkortostan government. Appeared in 2010 under President Rustem Khamitov.

Mission
The Republic of Bashkortostan Ministry of Youth and Sports is working to strengthen the Youth and Sports;

References

External links
 Republic of Bashkortostan Ministry of Youth and Sports Official Website in Russian

Politics of Bashkortostan
Government ministries of Bashkortostan
Bashkortostan